The Brown Nunataks are three nunataks lying  northwest of Walker Peak at the southwest extremity of Dufek Massif, Pensacola Mountains. They were mapped by the United States Geological Survey from surveys and from U.S. Navy air photos, 1956–66, and named by the Advisory Committee on Antarctic Names for John B. Brown, an ionospheric scientist in the Ellsworth Station winter party, 1957.

References 

Nunataks of Queen Elizabeth Land